San Germán is a historic town and municipality located in the Sabana Grande Valley of southwestern region of Puerto Rico, south of Mayagüez and Maricao, north of Lajas, east of Hormigueros and Cabo Rojo, and west of Sabana Grande. San Germán is spread over eighteen barrios plus San Germán Pueblo (the downtown area and the administrative center of the city). It is both a principal city of the San Germán–Cabo Rojo Metropolitan Statistical Area and the Mayagüez–San Germán–Cabo Rojo Combined Statistical Area.
San Germán is the second oldest city of Puerto Rico, after San Juan, and its historic downtown is preserved as the San Germán Historic District.

Puerto Rico was, at one time, divided administratively between the San Juan and the San Germán municipalities. The latter covered the western half of Puerto Rico and extended from the western shores of the island to Arecibo in the north and Ponce in the south.

History

The population of San Germán when Alonso Manso was named the first bishop of Puerto Rico in 1511 was "about 50 residents". Outside of San Juan, Puerto Rico, San Germán was one of the largest settlements in the 16th century, as well as Coamo and Aguada.

San Germán is also known as the "founder of towns", given the fact that in 1514 the Spanish Crown separated the island into two administrative territories (Partidos). The borders of the two partidos were established as the Camuy River to the north and the Jacagua River to the south. They were named the San Juan Partition and the San Germán Partition.

Spanish settlement in San Germán occurred early in the conquest and colonization of Puerto Rico. After the destruction of a small early settlement near modern-day Añasco during a Taíno uprising which started in February 1511, in 1512 the new settlement was built by Miguel Díaz at Guayanilla
and was named after Germaine of Foix, the second wife of King Fernando II, and in reference of Saint Germanus of Auxerre. This town was attacked by French corsairs in August 1528, May 1538 and 1554. The construction of a small fort began in 1540, but work stopped in 1546 when the population of the town began moving inland to the current modern location.

On May 12, 1571, the Royal Audience (Real Audiencia) of Santo Domingo authorized that both the populations of San Germán and Santa María de Guadianilla be merged into a single city due to the constant French attacks. The new city was built on the Hills of Santa Marta, next to the Guanajibo River in 1573. Its official name was Nueva Villa de Salamanca, named after the city of Salamanca in Spain. However, the population called the city San Germán el Nuevo (New San Germán) and, eventually, the Villa de San Germán (City of San Germán).

San Germán is also known as the "founder of towns", given the fact that in 1514 the Spanish Crown separated the island into two administrative territories (Partidos). The borders of the two partidos were established as the Camuy River to the north and the Jacagua River to the south. They were named the San Juan Partition and the San Germán Partition.

Hurricane Maria on September 20, 2017 triggered numerous landslides in San Germán with the significant amount of rainfall.

Geography
San Germán is in the southwest region of the island. The town is located on the Sabana Grande valley which is bound by the Cordillera Central to the north and the Santa Marta Hills and the Lajas Valley to the south. Mountains in San Germán include Alto del Descanso (2,520 ft; 768 m) and Tetas de Cerro Gordo (2,897 ft; 883 m). San Germán has a number of rivers: Río Caín, Río Duey, Río Rosario, Río Guanajibo (Estero), Río Hoconuco, Guamá River and Rio El Brujo.

Barrios

Like all municipalities of Puerto Rico, San Germán is subdivided into barrios.

 Ancones
 Caín Alto
 Caín Bajo
 Cotuí
 Duey Alto
 Duey Bajo
 Guamá
 Hoconuco Alto
 Hoconuco Bajo
 Maresúa
 Minillas
 Retiro
 Rosario Alto
 Rosario Bajo
 Rosario Peñón
 Sabana Eneas
 Sabana Grande Abajo
 San Germán barrio-pueblo
 Tuna

Sectors
Barrios (which are like minor civil divisions) and subbarrios, in turn, are further subdivided into smaller local populated place areas/units called sectores (sectors in English). The types of sectores may vary, from normally sector to urbanización to reparto to barriada to residencial, among others.

Special Communities

 (Special Communities of Puerto Rico) are marginalized communities whose citizens are experiencing a certain amount of social exclusion. A map shows these communities occur in nearly every municipality of the commonwealth. Of the 742 places that were on the list in 2014, the following barrios, communities, sectors, or neighborhoods were in San Germán: Ancones, Comunidad El Retiro, Comunidad Las Quebradas, La Tea, Parcelas Las Carolinas, Parcelas Minillas en Barrio Minillas, Parcelas Sabana Eneas, and Rosario Peñón.

Climate

Tourism

San Germán's historic downtown is the site of the Porta Coeli church, one of the earliest Spanish churches built in the Americas. Porta Coeli is still a major historical attraction that attracts both domestic and international tourists every year.

Landmarks and places of interest

 Puente de Bolas (Bridge of Balls)
 
  (San Germán history museum)
 Casa Morales
 Ceiba de la Libertad
 San Germán Historic Gallery
 Lola Rodríguez de Tió Museum
 Casa Cruz de la Luna
 Ramírez de Arrellano y Rossell Museum
 Santo Domingo Plazuela
 Three Races and One Culture Mural
 San Germán Historic District
 Porta Coeli
 Inter-American University of Puerto Rico
 Church San Germán de Auxerre

The urban center of San Germán is mainly composed of Spanish colonial houses. Many have been restored and conserve their Spanish look while other houses are somewhat abandoned and in poor condition. There are ongoing projects employing public and private funding to preserve and restore many houses and monuments and to maintain San Germán's colonial era look.

Culture

Festivals and events
San Germán celebrates its patron saint festival in late July / early August. The  is a religious and cultural celebration that generally features parades, games, artisans, amusement rides, regional food, and live entertainment.

Other festivals and events celebrated in San Germán include:
 Festival de la Pana - July
 Anón Festival - September
 Christmas Festival - December
 Christmas Parade - Early December
 Patron Celebrations (The Virgin of the Rosary)—Celebrated in San Germán's Rosario Poblado, which borders the municipality of Mayagüez.

Sports
San Germán is home to one of Puerto Rico's oldest basketball franchises, dating back to the 1930s, the San Germán Athletics (los Atléticos de San Germán), nicknamed "The Orange Monster". Many glories of Puerto Rican basketball have played in San Germán, a city that is also known as "The Cradle of Puerto Rican Basketball". Some of those players are Arquelio Torres, José "Piculín" Ortiz, Eddie Casiano, Nelson Quiñones, Elías "Larry" Ayuso, Christian Dalmau, and so many others. Their home court is The Arquelio Torres Ramírez Court, which houses approximately 5,000 fans.

The Athletic's fan base is most commonly referred to as their sixth man, or "The Orange Monster". This is because for a visiting team it's extremely hard to win in San Germán due to how vigorous and "into" the game the fans are.

The Athletics have been to 26 National Superior Basketball (BSN) Finals, of which one was cancelled (1953) due to confiscation because of a fight between players from San Germán and the Ponce Lions, giving birth to Puerto Rican basketball's most intense rivalry.

Championships (14): 1932, 1936, 1939, 1941, 1942, 1943, 1947, 1948, 1949, 1950, 1985, 1991, 1994, 1997
Sub-Championships (11): 1931, 1933, 1936, 1938, 1940, 1954, 1955, 1956, 1957, 1965, 1986

Economy

Agriculture
The area around San Germán grows fruits (banana, pineapple) and sugarcane on mid-scale. Dairy farms are also present in small scale. Some locals grow other produce on a small scale.

Business
Most businesses are located in or near the downtown area (San Germán Pueblo). Plaza del Oeste is the main shopping center.

Industry
Major employers of the city include Fresenius Kabi, CCL, Wallace International, Baxter Serum Mfg., Cordis, Insertco (print shop for medical instructions inserts), Wallace Silversmiths de Puerto Rico, General Electric (production of circuit breakers) and several other companies in the service industry.

Motion pictures filmed In San Germán
Act of Valor (2012) Which follows a Navy Seal squad on a covert mission to recover a kidnapped CIA Agent Morales (Roselyn Sánchez).
Dinero Sangre (1986) In a banana republic a ruthless mercenary waits to make a killing in gold. Only two people stand in his way (Guy Ecker)

Demographics

Government

Like all municipalities in Puerto Rico, San Germán is administered by a mayor. The current mayor is Virgilio Olivera Olivera from the New Progressive Party. Olivera was elected in the 2020 general election.

The city belongs to the Puerto Rico Senatorial district IV, which is represented by two Senators. In 2012, María Teresa González and Gilberto Rodríguez were elected as District Senators.

Transportation
By the 16th century there was a rough road called  (Camino Real) connecting San Germán (which was located near the mouth of the Añasco River) to other areas of Puerto Rico, including San Sebastián, Arecibo, Toa Alta, and Caparra.

In 2019, there were 44 bridges in San Germán.

Symbols
The  has an official flag and coat of arms.

Flag
Green - The Episcopal dignity and also the color of the Shield of Christopher Columbus and his son, don Diego Colón, Viceroy of the Indies, who named the city in honor of Germane de Foix.

White - The purity of the blood of the great families who colonized San Germán, according to a history book by Fray Íñigo Abbad y Lasierra, a Spanish Benedictine monk.

Purple - Color of the Shield of Juan Ponce de León, first governor of Puerto Rico.

Coat of arms
First Quarter: The Mitre and the Staff in a green field represent St. Germain of Auxerre, the Patron Saint of the city.

Second Quarter: The second quarter exhibits the arms of the Kingdoms of Aragón and Sicily, where don Fernando the Catholic reigned.

Third Quarter: In this quarter the arms combine with the County of Foix and the Kingdom of France, which constitute the family shields of Germaine de Foix whose name is perpetuated as the name of the city of San Germán.

Fourth Quarter: Is Ponce de León's shield.

The Crown: Is a civic or municipal standard and is used as a stamp for towns and cities; San Germán was assigned five towers to denote that this population formally obtained the title of city from the Spanish crown in the nineteenth century.

Education
The following schools are in San Germán:
Bartolome de Las Casas: PK-6
Georgina Alvarado: PK-5
Henry W. Longfellow: PK-5
Herminia C. Ramirez: PK-5
Julio Victor Guzman: KG-8
Laura Mercado: 6-12
Lola Rodriguez de Tio: 9-10	
Mariano Abril: PK-6
(Second Unit) Francisco Maria Quinones: KG-8

The main campus of the Inter-American University of Puerto Rico is located adjacent to the downtown area of San Germán. It was founded in 1912 as the Polytechnical Institute of Puerto Rico, the first private university on the island. The Colegio San José, was a private school which was established in San Germán in 1930 and closed in 2017.

Notable Puerto Ricans from San Germán
 PFC Joseph R. (José) Martínez destroyed a German infantry unit and tank in Tunisia, during World War II, by providing heavy artillery fire, saving his platoon from being attacked in the process. He was awarded the Distinguished Service Cross, second only to the Medal of Honor, by General George S. Patton, thus becoming the first Puerto Rican recipient of said military decoration.
Ubaldino Ramírez de Arellano—Senator
Lola Rodríguez de Tió—poet, author of the original lyrics of Puerto Rico's national anthem, La Borinqueña, and pro-independence advocate
Benjamín Marcantoni - opera singer
Benicio del Toro—Award-winning actor
Francisco Mariano Quiñones—Abolitionist and politician
Samuel R. Quiñones—Longest-serving President of the Puerto Rico Senate, serving for twenty years.

Gallery

See also

List of Puerto Ricans
History of Puerto Rico
National Register of Historic Places listings in San Germán, Puerto Rico
Did you know-Puerto Rico?

References

External links
 San German, Puerto Rico
 San Germán and its barrios, United States Census Bureau
 Official Webpage of the San German Atleticos
 Welcome to Puerto Rico! San German Map
 Welcome to Puerto Rico! San Germán
 San German Municipality on Facebook

 
Municipalities of Puerto Rico
Populated places established in 1511
San Germán–Cabo Rojo metropolitan area
1511 establishments in the Spanish Empire